Pietro Miglio (born 11 August 1910 in Trinità; died 16 June 1992 in Turin) was an Italian professional football player.

1910 births
1992 deaths
Italian footballers
Serie A players
Inter Milan players
A.C.R. Messina players
Casale F.B.C. players
Olbia Calcio 1905 players
Delfino Pescara 1936 players
Association football goalkeepers
A.C. Meda 1913 players
Vigevano Calcio players